Gregory C. Fajt (pronounced "fight"; born November 30, 1954) was the third chairman of the Pennsylvania Gaming Control Board. He was appointed to that position in June 2009. He currently serves as a Commissioner. Prior to serving on the Board, he served as chief of staff for Pennsylvania Governor Ed Rendell from 2007 to 2009. He served as secretary of Revenue from 2003 to 2007. He represented the 42nd legislative district in the Pennsylvania House of Representatives from 1991 to 1996.  He was also named "big brother of the year" for the Big Brothers and Big Sisters of Pittsburgh.  Currently, he is the citizen member of the Board of Claims for the Commonwealth of Pennsylvania.

References

1954 births
Living people
People from Greensburg, Pennsylvania
Chiefs of staff to United States state governors
State cabinet secretaries of Pennsylvania
Democratic Party members of the Pennsylvania House of Representatives
Members of American gaming commissions
Pennsylvania lawyers
Gambling in Pennsylvania